George Mullin may refer to:

 George Mullin (baseball) (1880–1944), American baseball pitcher
 George Mullin (VC) (1892–1963), American-Canadian recipient of the Victoria Cross during World War I

See also
George Mullins, Irish painter